Martin Hunter may refer to:

 Martin Hunter (football coach), English football coach
 Martin Hunter (British Army officer) (1757–1846), British Army general
 Martin Hunter (canoeist) (born 1965), Australian sprint canoeist
 Martin Hunter (EastEnders), fictional character in the BBC soap opera EastEnders
 J. Martin Hunter (1937–2021), British lawyer specializing in arbitration